Somchai Chantarasamrit (born 1 November 1944) is a former Thai cyclist. He competed at the 1964 Summer Olympics and the 1968 Summer Olympics.

References

External links
 

1944 births
Living people
Somchai Chantarasamrit
Somchai Chantarasamrit
Cyclists at the 1964 Summer Olympics
Cyclists at the 1968 Summer Olympics
Somchai Chantarasamrit
Asian Games medalists in cycling
Cyclists at the 1966 Asian Games
Cyclists at the 1970 Asian Games
Medalists at the 1966 Asian Games
Medalists at the 1970 Asian Games
Somchai Chantarasamrit
Somchai Chantarasamrit